"Tassez-vous de d'là" is a song by the Quebec band Les Colocs. The lyrics were written by Dédé Fortin, with a chorus in Wolof written by Senegalese immigrant El Hadji Diouf; the music was written by Dédé Fortin and André "Vander" Vanderbiest.

Tassez won the 1999 SOCAN award for best popular song of the year. It was the first single off their last album Dehors Novembre.

Meaning
The song is written in the Quebec joual dialect. The title, loosely translated, means "get out of the way"; the song describes the narrator's guilt at having abandoned a friend who had overdosed, and his desire to see his friend again.

The music video was shot in Montreal, more specifically on Emery Street between Sanguinet and St-Denis streets.

References

Les Colocs songs
Quebec songs
1998 songs